Kučera (feminine Kučerová) is a Czech and Slovak surname denoting a person with a curly hair.

It may refer to:

 Adriana Kučerová, Slovak soprano
 Alena Kučerová, Czech printmaker
 Antonín Kučera, Czech footballer
 Bob Kucera (1944-), Australian politician
 Bohumil Kučera (1874–1921), Czech physicist
 Daniel Kucera (1923—2017), American Roman Catholic bishop
 Eduard Kučera, Czech entrepreneur
 František Kučera (1968—), Czech ice hockey defenceman
 Gabriela Kučerová, Czech-German tennis player
 Henry Kučera, originally Jindřich Kučera (1925-2010), Czech linguist
 Jakub Kučera, Czech footballer
 Jaroslav Kučera, Czech cinematographer
 Jiří Kučera, Czech ice hockey player
 John Kucera (1984—), Canadian alpine ski racer
 Karol Kučera (1974—), Slovak tennis player
 Klára Kučerová, Czech writer
 Louis Benedict Kucera (1888-1957), American Roman Catholic bishop
 Lubica Kucerova, Slovak fashion designer
 Magdalena Kučerová, Czech-German tennis player
 Marcel Kučera (1971–), Czech ice hockey goaltender
 Martin Kučera (1990—), Slovak athlete
 Martin Kučera (ice hockey) (1978—), Slovak ice hockey goaltender
 Milan Kučera (disambiguation), several people
 Nikol Kučerová, Czech freestyle skier
 Oldřich Kučera, Czech ice hockey player
 Ondřej Kučera (1987—), Czech footballer
 Oton Kučera (1857–1931), Croatian astronomer
 Radim Kučera (1974-), Czech footballer
 Renata Kučerová, Czech tennis player
 René Kučera (1972-), Czech Olympian sprint-canoer
 Rudolf Kučera, Czech footballer
 Štěpán Kučera (1984-), Czech footballer
 Tomáš Kučera (disambiguation), several people
 Vladimír Kučera, Czech boxer
 Vojtěch Kučera (1975-), Czech poet

Czech-language surnames
Slovak-language surnames
Surnames from nicknames